The Perfect Match (富貴吉祥) is a 1991 Hong Kong film directed by Stephen Shin.

Cast
 George Lam as Koo
 Maggie Cheung as Carrie Kam
 Jacky Cheung as Jacky Kam
 Vivian Chow as Philidonna
 Dennis Chan	
 Chan Man-Ho as Madonna's maid
 Cheng Chi-Gong		
 Cheng Chi-Keung		
 Cheng Pak Lam		
 Hau Woon Ling		
 Benz Hui as Koo's Manager
 Tony Leung Hung-Wah	
 Cynthia Khan as Philidonna's Cousin
 Lai Bei-Dak
 Lam Chi-wah	
 Brenda Lo	
 Lydia Shum as Madonna
 Sin Gam-Ching	
 Tse Wai-Kit	
 Wong Kim-Ching		
 Manfred Wong		
 Yip Hon Leung		
 Kingdom Yuen as Manager's Assistant

External links
 IMDb entry
 Hong Kong Cinemagic entry

Hong Kong romantic comedy films
1990s Cantonese-language films
1991 films
1990s Hong Kong films